Ma On Shan (literally: Horse Saddle Peak) is a saddle-shaped peak in east of Tolo Harbour in the New Territories of Hong Kong. With a height of 702 metres (2,303 ft), it stands among the ten highest mountains in Hong Kong. The mountain borders Sha Tin and Tai Po districts.

Beneath the west face of the mountain along Tolo Harbour, the Ma On Shan new town extension, administratively part of Sha Tin, is named after the hill. It ends north in Wu Kai Sha.

Geography 
Ma On Shan can be distinguished by the west face which looks like a saddle, and "Ma On Shan" can be translated as "horse saddle mountain". Nine streams flow down from Ma On Shan, with the biggest located on the southwest slope of Ma On Shan, near Ma On Shan Village.

A group of villages located east of the peak is named Shap Sze Heung and the harbour of Three Fathoms Cove.

Geology 

Ma On Shan is formed by volcanic rocks, much like many of the tallest mountains in Hong Kong, such as Tai Mo Shan. Some shorter mountains in Hong Kong are formed by older Granitic rocks. 

In the 20th century, the mountain was formerly mined for its high-purity (60%) iron ore, with annual output in the 1950s and 1960s exceeding 100,000 tonnes. An extensive network of tunnels is buried under the hill. The iron mine was abandoned when it became uncompetitive, in the 1970s.

Vegetation
The north slope of Ma On Shan is mostly tree-covered, while the south slope is mainly shrubs and grasses. On these hostile volcanic hills, only hardy and highly adaptable plants survive. There are some rare flora species, including Rhododendron simsii, which blooms with red flowers in late March, and two other species of native Rhododendron. Rare and protected species of plants also grow on Ma On Shan including the Chinese Lily (Lilium brownii) which is found on the mountain's eastern slope.

A few types of wild orchid grow in the streams of Ma On Shan, including Hong Kong's most common orchid, the Bamboo Orchid, so called because its distinctive stem resembles bamboo.

Wildlife
The natural environment of Ma On Shan is relatively undisturbed, so this valuable sanctuary gives shelter to many wildlife species. Common mammals are Chinese pangolin (Manis pentadactyla), Chinese porcupine (Hystrix brachyura), wild boar (Sus scrofa) and common muntjac (Muntiacus muntjac).

Conservation
The north and north-east slopes of The Hunch Backs and the east slope of Ma On Shan, covering an area of 118 hectares, was designated as a Site of Special Scientific Interest in 1976.

See also
 List of mountains, peaks and hills in Hong Kong
 Ma On Shan (town) - new town development to the northern side of the peak
 The Hunch Backs
 List of storms named Ma-on

References

Mountains, peaks and hills of Hong Kong

Sha Tin District
Tai Po District